Dirt Nasty is the self-titled debut album by artist Dirt Nasty, also known as Simon Rex. Dirt Nasty was released by Shoot To Kill Music in association with Myspace Records. The album's most popular track was "1980," which was distributed on MySpace and iTunes. Dirt Nasty is credited as the impetus behind Mickey Avalon's personal rediscovery of, and subsequent success in, hip hop. Mickey Avalon's song "My Dick" (featuring Dirt Nasty and Andre Legacy) was featured in the 2008 movie Harold & Kumar Escape from Guantanamo Bay.

Track listing
 "Droppin' Names" - 3:35
 "Can't Get Down" - 3:28
 "1980" - 3:06
 "Cracker Ass Fantastic" - 3:27
 "Too Sexy (ft. Mickey Avalon)" - 3:16
 "Baby Dick" - 2:48
 "Gotta Leave This Town" - 2:58
 "Animal Lover" - 2:53
 "Too Short Homage" - 3:38
 "Wanna Get High (ft. Andre Legacy)" - 3:4
 "True Hollywood Story" - 3:42. 
 "Mountain Man (ft. Tony Potato)" - 3:31

Curiosity
The song "1980" starts off with the phrase "What happened to your queer party friends?" This quote is said by Jack Nicholson in the film As Good as It Gets which was released in 1997.

References

External links
Dirt Nasty official site
Dirt Nasty by Dirt Nasty: Reviews and ratings at Rate Your Music
Dirt Nasty MySpace profile
Shoot To Kill Music's label page at Discogs

2007 debut albums
Simon Rex albums